Zombie Highway is a survival game developed by American studio Auxbrain but removed from iOS and Android devices through their respective app stores. The game is a single-player driving game where the player controls a car and must try to survive as long as possible while zombies are jumping onto the sides of the car. Two sequels have been released: Zombie Highway 2 and Zombie Highway: Driver's Ed.

Zombie Highway and the other games of the franchise are currently unavailable as Auxbrain has announced that they will be focusing on other games.

Gameplay
In Zombie Highway, the player controls a car and must try to survive as long as possible while zombies are jumping onto the sides of the car. The zombies have their own health bars which can be depleted by shooting them. If there are enough zombies on the car it will topple over and the game will end. There are obstacles on the road that the player must avoid, which end the game if hit.

Reception
Zombie Highway received positive reception from critics, garnering a rating of 76 out of a possible 100 on the review aggregator website Metacritic, based on 6 critic reviews.

References

2010 video games
Android (operating system) games
IOS games
Mobile games
Survival video games
Video games developed in the United States
Video games about zombies
Single-player video games